The H-4 SOW (Stand-Off Weapon) is a precision-guided glide bomb manufactured by NESCOM and deployed by the Pakistan Air Force, capable of striking targets at stand-off range. It has a terminal guidance system based on an infrared homing seeker, which identifies the target during the final stage of flight. Designed to hit targets out to 120 km, the bomb may have the capability to evade radar.

Design & Development
According to Pakistani press reports, the H-4 glide bomb was created by Pakistan's National Engineering and Scientific Commission (NESCOM), working in collaboration with the Pakistan Missile Organisation and Air Weapons Complex in Pakistan. A lighter version of the H-4 has also been produced, the H-2 SOW, which has a stated range of 60 km.

Three successful tests were conducted, the last one in 2003, which led to field deployment on the Dassault Mirage III and Mirage V strike fighters of the Pakistan Air Force. It has also been stated that the H-4 will be integrated with the PAF's new multi-role combat aircraft, the JF-17, which is replacing the ageing fleet of Mirage III and Dassault Mirage 5 aircraft. All Pakistani JF-17 fighters, from the initial JF-17 Block 1 model to the final Block 3 version, will be capable of launching the H-4.

The H-4's stated range of 120 km and its glide bomb design has led to speculation that it may be a Pakistani variant of the Denel Raptor II glide bomb, which is also guided by an infrared homing seeker and has a range of 120 km.

Operational History
On 27 February 2019, 2 Pakistani Dassault Mirage-VPAs armed with H-4 SOW bombs  and 2 Dassault Mirage-IIIDAs for guidance via data link carried out airstrikes in Indian Administered Kashmir targeting Indian Army brigade headquarters and forward support depots. The planes were able to lock onto the targets, however at the last moment, Pakistani Weapon system Officers took their cursor off them. This was confirmed by in-cockpit videos released by the PAF’s operations directorate for the 6th September telecast which showed that the Airforce deliberately did not target the Indian Military sites despite having them in clear sight.

Later in April 2019, Indian media reported that a Bomb disposal unit carried out a bomb defusal operation in Mendhar and Rajouri, where they had successfully defused 3-4 unexploded H-4 SOW bombs.

Operators
: Pakistan Air force

See also
H-2 SOW: Lighter Variant of the H-4.
 GBU-53/B
 AGM-154 Joint Standoff Weapon

References

External links
 Dawn - a Pakistani newspaper article on H-4
 The Times of India - an Indian newspaper article on H-4
 The Tribune - an Indian newspaper article on H-4
Aeronaut

Science and technology in Pakistan
Aerial bombs of Pakistan
Guided bombs
Military equipment introduced in the 2000s